Sysprep  is Microsoft's System Preparation Tool for Microsoft Windows operating system deployment.

History
Sysprep was originally introduced for use with Windows NT 4.0. Later versions introduced for Windows 2000, Windows XP and Windows Server 2003 are available for download from Microsoft website and included in the Windows CD. Windows Vista is the first version of Windows NT to include a version of Sysprep that was independent of the hardware abstraction layer (HAL), in the "out of box" installation.

Purpose
Desktop deployment is typically performed via disk cloning utility. Sysprep can be used to prepare an operating system for disk cloning and restoration via a disk image.

Windows operating system installations include many unique elements per installation that need to be "generalized" before capturing and deploying a disk image to multiple computers. Some of these elements include:
 Computer name
 Security Identifier (SID)
 Driver Cache

Sysprep seeks to solve these issues by allowing for the generation of new computer names, unique SIDs, and custom driver cache databases during the Sysprep process.

Administrators can use tools such as SetupMgr.exe (Windows XP) or the Windows Automated Installation Kit (Windows Vista/7/Server 2008) to generate answer files that Sysprep will process on new computer deployments.

Alternatives to Sysprep
Mark Russinovich of Sysinternals created a partial alternative to Sysprep, named NewSID, in 1997. However, after his own further analysis and research, Russinovich concluded that having duplicate SIDs is a non-issue and arranged NewSID's retirement.

References

External links
 Windows 2000 System Preparation Tool (Sysprep) Version 1.1
 How to use the Sysprep tool to automate successful deployment of Windows XP
 Hardware devices not installed in Sysprep image - 
 Description of New Features in Sysprep for Windows XP - 
 Informational guide on how to use Sysprep for deploying Windows 2000/XP
 Sysprep for Windows 2008 R2
 Microsoft: TechNet: Windows Sysinternals: NewSID v4.10
 SelfImage wiki: Post-cloning operations (discusses Sysprep, also mentions NewSID)

Windows administration